This is a list of places in Nassau County, New York. Nassau County, on Long Island, became a county in the U.S. state of New York in 1899 after separating from Queens County. Included in the list are two cities, three towns, 64 incorporated villages, and 63 unincorporated hamlets whose names are used for overlapping Census-designated places (CDPs). Also included in the list are five CDPs not generally included as hamlets, and two non-CDP hamlets (East Garden City and North Woodmere).
The U.S. Postal Service has organized Nassau County into 111 different five-digit ZIP Codes served by 63 different post offices. Each post office has the same name as a city, hamlet or village, but the boundaries are seldom the same.

Notes

References